William Hurley (known works 1319–1354) held the title of king's master carpenter for King Edward III of England.

Hurley came from Hurley in Berkshire. He was in charge of timber works for all royal buildings, including the Tower of London, Windsor Castle, the Palace of Westminster and St Stephen's Chapel. He is best known for the lantern tower on top of the octagon at Ely Cathedral. The tower was started in 1334.

References
"William Hurley", Dictionary of the Middle Ages

14th-century English architects
People from Hurley, Berkshire
13th-century births
14th-century deaths
Architects from Berkshire
English carpenters